The Hand is a supervillain organization appearing in American comic books published by Marvel Comics. The Hand first appeared in Daredevil #174 (September 1981) and was created by writer/artist Frank Miller.

The Hand is an order of evil mystical ninjas who are heavily involved in organized crime and mercenary activities such as assassination plots. The Hand covets power above all other objectives. They are primarily based in Japan, but operate internationally. They were founded in 1588 as a secret society of Japanese nationalist samurai but were soon co-opted by the Snakeroot, an ancient ninja clan which serves a primordial demon known only as "The Beast of the Hand".

Members of the Hand are practitioners of powerful occult magic and can murder a person and bring that person back to life as a servant of the Hand, but a few are known to have reversed this programming. The Hand's most dangerous adversary is The Chaste, a band of warriors once led by Stick, the blind martial arts master and mentor of Matt Murdock, who grew to become the costumed crime-fighter Daredevil. Murdock would eventually, after many bitter battles, accept the offer of becoming the master of the Hand for a time.

The Hand has appeared in the Marvel Cinematic Universe television shows Daredevil, Iron Fist, and The Defenders.

Publication history

The Hand first appeared in Daredevil volume 1 #174 (September 1981) and was created by writer/artist Frank Miller.

Fictional organization history

Origins

The story begins 800 years ago, in feudal Japan. Seeking autonomy from the oppressive class system of the time, a few citizens fled into the mountainous regions of Iga and Kōga. There they developed ninjitsu, a stealthy martial art perhaps inspired by Sun Tzu's The Art of War. Over a period of centuries, they refined their art in secluded camps. Students trained and practiced the art from birth, playing children's games designed to impart expertise in unarmed combat, swordplay, weaponry, camouflage, escape, and evasion. Ninjitsu was also designed to encourage spiritual growth by pushing oneself physically and mentally beyond normal human limits. The ninja were experts in espionage and assassination, and offered their specialized services to samurai warlords and others who could afford them.

Masters of every form of subterfuge, the ninja were the most efficient and deadly warriors on the face of the Earth and became feared throughout Japan. Hearsay gave rise to the myth that ninja were the spawn of the Tengu, and that their divinity gave them extraordinary abilities. These myths were likely spread by the ninja themselves. Nonetheless, it would seem that an ancient ninja clan known as the Snakeroot can and does trace their bloodline back to these demons.

In 1588, Kagenobu Yoshioka became sensei of the Ishiyama Sword School located in the Japanese village of Kyushua. Facing growing frustrations with the corrupt government that had been tainted by foreign influence, Yoshioka transformed the school into a training ground for samurais whose goal was to put power back in the hands of the Japanese people. Thus, the Hand was born. Just as a hand has five fingers, members of the inner circle of the Hand were leaders of organizations which each operated from one of Japan's five islands.

Upon the mutinous murder of Yoshioka, the Snakeroot ninja clan took control of the Hand and corrupted it by imposing the cult of a demon known as The Beast, which imbued them with dark magic. One of these black spells causes a Hand ninja's lifeless body to return to dust and prevent another from directly gazing at the Beast itself. Unlike the other factions of ninja, this "new" Hand both worked as mercenaries and sought power themselves. The Hand sought dominance over all others, working for allies of convenience while seeking to eliminate their enemies.

Modern times
After the end of World War II, a select few of the more politically oriented members of the Hand formed the original HYDRA as a cabal of Japanese ultranationalists who plotted to overthrow the Japanese liberal democratic government, assassinate the prime minister, and install a neo-militarist government, which would rearm Japan. Shortly upon joining HYDRA, Baron Strucker seized control of the organization from its Japanese founders and slowly steered the organization towards the goal of world domination. The Hand and HYDRA have nevertheless collaborated in numerous subversive or criminal conspiracies over the years.

The Hand has survived into the early 21st century, still seeking power in various forms, and using their lethal skills and brutal methods. The Hand's most dangerous adversary is The Chaste, a band of warriors once led by Stick, the late, blind martial arts master and former mentor of the man who grew to become the costumed crime-fighter Daredevil (Matt Murdock). Another of his former pupils, Elektra Natchios, has also been involved with the Hand. She infiltrated the Hand, determined to prove herself to Stick. Instead, the ninja tricked her into killing one of her former sensei. Elektra served the Hand for a time, but after their ways corrupted her soul, she fled Japan back to America.

Eventually, the Hand sought to wipe out Stick and the good warriors of the Chaste altogether. Stick thwarted an assassination attempt by four Hand operatives; he then summoned the other members of his order (Shaft, Stone, and Claw) to New York City. With the assistance of his clan, Stick defeated Kirigi, the Hand's most lethal ninja at the time. The Hand regrouped and attacked Stick and his band of warriors that now included Daredevil and his current lover, Black Widow. The Hand had almost overpowered the small band of warriors, when Stick and Shaft resorted to an ancient technique that drained the life force from all ninja present. Unfortunately, the technique resulted in the explosion of Stick and his comrade as a result of the excess energy they had absorbed. Despite their casualties and the escape of the Chaste's superhero allies, the Hand considered the destruction of their nemesis and leader of their enemy a victory and turned their attention to other schemes.

Years later, the Hand turned its attention to the leaderless Chaste, once again attempting to destroy them, this time to prevent the Chaste's members from locating the new-born child that would bear Stick's reincarnated soul. The Hand severely crippled Stick's soldiers, reducing their number to a handful of warriors. The few remaining Chaste traveled to New York, seeking the assistance of Daredevil. Reluctantly, the Man Without Fear aided his former mentor's disciples, returning with them to Japan. Once there, the Hand attacked the Chaste and Daredevil relentlessly. Fighting alongside Daredevil, the Chaste barely managed to escape and safeguard their master's reincarnated spirit.

The Hand has also frequently fought with Wolverine, and come into conflict with superheroes such as Spider-Man, the Avengers, and the X-Men. The Hand played a particularly large role in the histories of Betsy Braddock and Kwannon, the two characters to use the Psylocke moniker.

Elektra led the Hand for some time but when she was killed it was revealed that this Elektra was actually a Skrull, temporarily leaving the Hand without a warlord. One faction, led by Lord Hiroshi and his lieutenant Lady Bullseye, has aimed to make Daredevil their new leader, an offer the latter rejected, only to be told that "the Hand doesn't take no for an answer." They then instigated the return of the Kingpin to New York City, with the goal of offering him the leadership instead. Kingpin's first act in negotiations is to kill Hiroshi with his bare hands, to "thank him" for realizing he can't escape his role as the Kingpin, and for murdering his girlfriend and her kids. However, the proceedings were interrupted by Daredevil, who accepted their offer, on the condition that the Hand should not do business with the Kingpin or Lady Bullseye again. The three remaining ninja-lords accepted this arrangement. During that time, the Hand gains Black Tarantula and White Tiger as members.

The Hand plays a major part in the 2010 "Shadowland" storyline where Daredevil uses the Hand as a force of justice. When Bullseye attacks his fortress, Daredevil ends up killing him in the same manner as Bullseye did to Elektra. Most of the street-based superheroes (consisting of Spider-Man, Iron Fist, Luke Cage, Misty Knight, Moon Knight, Shang-Chi, and Colleen Wing) try to reason with Daredevil only for Kingpin and Lady Bullseye to unleash Ghost Rider upon Shadowland. Daredevil blames them for the diversion and has the Hand attack them. Following a fight with the street-based superheroes who escaped with Punisher's help, Daredevil states that he will plan to resurrect Bullseye to serve him. He is then approached by Elektra, who apparently swears her allegiance to him. The street-based heroes are visited by Master Izo, who states that the Snakeroot Clan plan to make Daredevil a vessel for the Beast of the Hand (who desires nothing but darkness and destruction). Later Colleen Wing learns from Daredevil that her mother had led a female faction of the Hand called the "Nail". Colleen eventually accepts Daredevil's offer to join the Nail. It is shown that the Hand also has a faction called the Underhand which are a group of ninjas that are already dead. This, when Luke Cage is visited by his old friend Lacy Kimbro, who tells Luke that her son Darris is among the cops that are held prisoners by the Underhand.<ref>Thunderbolts #148</ref> Realizing that Daredevil is possessed by the demonic Beast of the Hand, the heroes gather together to try to fight him themselves. Despite their efforts to interrupt Bullseye's resurrection ceremony, even a direct attack from Wolverine fails to kill the now-demonic Daredevil. Daredevil throws off Elektra and Spider-Man's attempts to reason with him, as he proclaims "There is no Murdock! There is only the Beast!". Although Iron Fist is able to heal Daredevil of the 'infection' by using his chi punch to cure Daredevil's soul, Kingpin and Typhoid Mary take advantage of the chaos in the aftermath of the war to take command of the Hand for themselves.

The Hand later ends up in a gang war with the Yakuza which has been orchestrated by Sabretooth. 

As part of the 2012 Marvel NOW! branding, Shadowland is attacked by Superior Spider-Man (Doctor Octopus' mind in Spider-Man's body) and his Spiderlings as the Hand ninjas engage them. In the aftermath of the attack on Shadowland, some of the Hand ninjas who evaded capture arrive in the sewers to join up with the Goblin Nation which is led by Goblin King.

Following the 2016 "Civil War II" storyline, the Hand has entered an allegiance with Daniel Drumm's ghost. After the funeral of Bruce Banner, the Hand steals his body so that they can use it to strengthen their ranks. The Uncanny Avengers find where the Hand is performing their ritual and that they have already revived Bruce Banner, who appears before them as Hulk wearing samurai armor. During that time, it was revealed that the Beast of the Hand was in control of the Hulk. The Uncanny Avengers were able to sever the Beast of the Hand's control as Bruce Banner returns to the dead.

During the Secret Empire storyline, the Hand is encountered by the Underground in Madripoor where they are under the control of Hive.

When Old Man Logan faces off against the Hand, he faced their latest member called the Scarlet Samurai. Logan later discovered that Scarlet Samurai is Mariko Yashida who was resurrected by the Hand to serve them.

During the events of the 2022 Punisher series and Daredevil by Chip Zdarsky, Frank Castle has become the new leader of the Hand, with Matt Murdock and Elektra embarking to start The Fist, an origination meant to counter The Hand.

Known members
 The Beast of the Hand - A demon that is worshiped by the Hand, the Snakeroot Clan, and the True Believers.
 Abraham Cornelius - 
 Akatora - 
 Akuma - A ninja who is a member of the Hand.
 Arthur Perry - An insane cyborg assassin and former S.H.I.E.L.D. Agent.
 Azuma Goda - Director of the Hand's Japanese branch.
 Azumi Ozawa -
 Bakuto - Daimyo of the Hand's South America branch. Killed by White Tiger.
 Betsy Braddock - X-Men member brainwashed by the hand and body-swapped with Kwannon.
 Black Tarantula 
 Blink  
 Buzzard Brothers - Boyd and Buford Buzzard are a cannibal duo who have had a run-in with Wolverine. They are later sprung from jail by the Hand to serve them.
 Daredevil - Matthew Murdock
 Elektra 
 Eliza Martinez  
 Erynys - A virtual clone of Elektra created by the Hand. She is a reanimated corpse bonded to the dark aspects of Elektra's persona.
 Gorgon - A leader of the Hand with ties to Hydra.
 Hand's Superhuman Army - Superhumans that were killed and resurrected by the Hand to serve as HYDRA's superhuman assassins.
 Northstar 
 Poison
 S.H.O.C. - 
 Spot
 Slyde -
 Hobgoblin - An assassin who is Kingpin's right-hand man.
 Iron Monk - A Master in the Hand. No mortal hand or blade can harm him and not even bullets can take him down.
 Izanagi - 
 Jonin - 
 Junzo Muto - A former leader of the Hand who is one of the deadliest martial artists in the Marvel Universe.
 Kagenobu Yoshioka - Founder of the Hand.
 Sasaki - Kagenobu Yoshioka's right-hand man.
 Ken Wind - 
 Kingpin Kirigi 
 Kuroyama 
 Kwannon - Former assassin for the Hand. Later body-swapped with Betsy Braddock and affiliated with the X-Men and the Hellions.
 Lady Bullseye Lady Gorgon - A Hand operative who lost her high-ranking position after failing to kill Punisher. She was killed by Master Yoshiokya.
 Lord Hiroshi Lyle Crawford 
 Makoto - Daimyo of Eurasia.
 Mandarin 
 Master Izo - Founder of the Chaste.
 Matsu'o Tsurayaba 
 The Nail - A faction of the Hand composed of women only.
 Black Lotus 
 Cherry Blossom - A 17-year-old ninja who later leaves The Nail with Colleen Wing after defeating Black Lotus in a duel.
 Colleen Wing 
 Makro - Member of the Nail. An unknown experimental corporation augmented her with extra weaponized limbs, similar to Doctor Octopus. Her codename refers to the Japanese Giant Spider-Crab.
 Yuki - Member of the Nail. She bases her motif after the Yuki-onna which includes wearing white face paint and a blue and white kimono to create an eerie look. She's known for her ghoulish fighting style and quick, debilitating movements.
 Nina McCabe - A former ward of Elektra.
 Mystique - Member of the Japanese Branch.
 Omega Red - He was revived from suspended animation by Matsu'o Tsurayaba to serve him.
 Punisher - Leader of The Hand.
 Phaedra - A member of the Hand who was responsible for resurrecting Shingen Yashida.
 Sabretooth - Head of the Japanese Branch.
 Scarlet Samurai - The Hand resurrected Mariko Yashida to serve the Hand as the Scarlet Samurai.
 Shingen Yashida - 
 Silver Samurai - The Hand wanted Silver Samurai to lead them in order to unite the Japanese underworld. Silver Samurai declined the offer and helped the New Avengers defeat the Hand.
 Silver Samurai II - The son of the original Silver Samurai who is a member of the Japanese Branch.
 The Snakeroot Clan - A faction from which the Hand splinters.Shoji Soma - Grandmaster of the Snakeroot Clan.
 Bisento - Member of the Snakeroot Clan. Killed by Stone of the Chaste.
 Budo - Harry Kenkoy was a former United States Marine General and member of the Snakeroot Clan. He took part in the creation of the About Face Virus. Killed by Eddie Passim.
 Daito - Leader of the Snakeroot Clan. Committed ritual suicide.
 Tegaki - The current leader of the Snakeroot Clan and former lover of Elektra. He was a former second-in-command of Daito until Daito committed ritual suicide causing Tekagi to succeed him.
 Doka - Member of the Snakeroot Clan. He was abused by his parents when he was young and killed them by setting fire to their house. Killed by Elektra during the Snakeroot Clan's attack on the Chaste's fortress.
 Enteki - An archer who is a member of the Snakeroot Clan. Accidentally killed by a sai thrown by another clan member.
 Enteki' - Member of the Snakeroot Clan and son of Enteki.
 Feruze - An African-American member of the Snakeroot Clan.
 Genkotsu - Member of the Snakeroot Clan. He was a former holy man who is the Snakeroot Clan's torturer.
 Harry Kenkoy - A former United States Marine corps general and member of the Snakeroot Clan.
 Osaku - A Russian female descendants of the Tsars and member of the Snakeroot Clan.
 Takashi - Daimyo of Japan.
 Tiberius Stone - A scientist and CEO of Viastone and who later worked for The Hand.
 Tombstone 
 True Believers - A faction of the Hand.
 Karsano - Karsano is a Korean assassin who is a member of the True Believes and the first person to use the codename "Dragonfly".>
 Meiko Yin - Meiko Yin is the cousin of Angela Yin, who is the second person in the True Believers to use the codename "Dragonfly".
 Typhoid Mary 
 The Underhand - A group of ninjas that are already dead.
 Viper 
 White Tiger 
 Wolverine 
 Yutaka''' - Daimyo of Africa.

 Other versions 
The Kingpin contacts the Hand for assistance against the Punisher in the "Homeless" story-arc of Punisher Max. While the organization provides the Kingpin with Elektra for use as a bodyguard, it refuses to directly hunt and eliminate the Punisher due to having the utmost respect for the vigilante and his prowess at killing. The Hand is later revealed to be in league with Vanessa Fisk, who intends to have Elektra seduce and murder the Kingpin. After the Punisher cripples Elektra and kills the Kingpin, the Hand recovers the former, and euthanizes her when it becomes apparent that the severity of her injuries have rendered her incapable of ever walking again.

In other media

Television
 In the Iron Man episode Hands of the Mandarin, Mandarin's minions Hypnotia, Living Laser, Blacklash, Whirlwind, and Blizzard are referred to as members of the Hand by the news media.
 The Hand are introduced in Daredevil.  In the first season, their leader "Alexandra Reid" forms an alliance with Wilson Fisk, using Madame Gao and Nobu Yoshioka as intermediaries. Fisk and the Ranskahov brothers traffic Gao's heroin while Nobu works with Fisk to acquire Elena Cardenas' tenement building so the Hand can use it as the foundation of Midland Circle. Nobu also uses his connections with Fisk to transport a "Black Sky", a person Alexandra considers an ideal weapon for the Hand's agenda, but Stick and Matt Murdock attack Nobu's party and Stick kills the Black Sky, creating friction between Nobu and Fisk. Fisk, wanting Nobu out of the way, has a junkie stab Elena to death and then give Matt information that lures him to an empty warehouse. Matt is ambushed by Nobu and the resulting battle ends with Matt setting Nobu on fire, seemingly burning him alive. Madame Gao, in the meanwhile, conspires with Leland Owlsley to have Vanessa Mariana poisoned in an attempt to get Fisk to focus on his criminal empire, but the attempt fails. She later leaves town after Matt leads the police to one of her drug labs. In the second season, the Hand resurrects Nobu and uses the blood of children to produce a new "Black Sky". Nobu is served by a redheaded woman named Tyler. The Hand's ninjas are indicated to have the ability to slow their heart rates, making it difficult for Matt's enhanced hearing and radar sense to detect them, though he is aided by Elektra and Stick. Madame Gao makes an appearance late in the season where it's revealed she is a competitor to the mysterious "Blacksmith" behind the death of Frank Castle's family. Nobu takes Karen Page, Turk Barrett and others hostage as bait for Matt. Elektra is killed protecting Matt from Nobu, before Matt and Frank dispatch Nobu's followers, and Stick beheads Nobu. Alexandra arranges for Elektra's exhumed body to be resurrected with the last of the dragon bones as the "Black Sky".
 The Hand appear in season one of Iron Fist. Madame Gao's ties to the Hand are revealed along with a number of associates serving her to include brothers Andrei and Grigori Veznikov, the Bride of Nine Spiders, Scythe, King, Alexi, Vando, and Zhou Cheng. Her branch uses Rand Enterprises as a front to smuggle heroin into New York City, thanks to having brokered a deal with Harold Meachum to resurrect him after his death. Bakuto is a leader of a faction of the Hand who runs a camp that recruits orphaned and runaway kids. Colleen Wing is a former student of Bakuto, and uses her dojo's classes to supply him with recruits. Danny Rand, the Iron Fist, is a guardian of K'un-Lun and sworn to destroy the Hand. Danny is shocked to learn about the Hand's infiltration of his father's company when he returns to New York City after a fifteen year absence. Danny manages to drive the Hand out of Rand, but in the process is betrayed by Harold, who attempts to frame him for their criminal activities.
 The Hand appear in The Defenders. With Alexandra having months left to live before her organs fail and the Hand having used what's left of the "substance" to revive Elektra, she expedites their masterplan to extract fossilized dragons under Manhattan, in the process triggering an artificial earthquake. To facilitate the project, Sowande is hiring young men from Harlem to do dirty work, then killing them off once they served their purpose. This brings their activities to the attention of Detective Misty Knight, and later on Luke Cage after Sowande kills two brothers of Candace Miller, Misty's would-be witness against Mariah Dillard. Things begin to fall apart when John Raymond, the architect who built Midland Circle, realizes the Hand's plan and plots to destroy the building, a case which Misty also begins investigating after Jessica Jones discovers that Raymond has been stockpiling explosives in a seedy apartment. To silence Raymond, Alexandra sends Elektra to Jessica's apartment to capture him, but he shoots himself. Matt gets drawn into Jessica's investigation after Foggy asks him to keep an eye on her as a favor for Jeri Hogarth. Matt, Jessica, Luke and Danny all later meet up when their investigations into the Hand lead them to Midland Circle. After fighting off Elektra and several waves of henchmen, they escape to the Royal Dragon, where Stick shows up and gives them a rundown on the Hand's leaders. Alexandra, Bakuto, Murakami, Madame Gao and Sowande track the heroes down to the restaurant and attempt to capture Danny, but they escape, with Luke successfully capturing Sowande after a drawn-out fight. Stick later decapitates Sowande when he tries to kidnap Danny and mails his head to Alexandra in a box as a message. Alexandra's authority is further challenged when Elektra begins to remember her past association with Matt. Elektra later captures Danny, killing Stick in the process, and then abruptly kills Alexandra while asserting control of the Hand. Elektra takes Danny down into the pit the Hand have been digging below Midland Circle, and provokes him into using the Iron Fist to break down a wall that blocks the Hand from accessing the dragon bones. Matt, Luke and Jessica, who have been picked up by the NYPD in light of Stick's murder, escape the 29th Precinct and return to Midland Circle backed up by Colleen, Claire and Misty. Colleen manages to kill Bakuto after he cut off Misty's right arm. The heroes then proceed to carry out Raymond's plan to implode Midland Circle, which fills the hole. Matt is presumed killed in the collapse, but is later shown to have survived. Elektra, Madame Gao and Murakami are dead under Midland Circle.

Film
 In the film Elektra (2005), the Hand is led by Master Roshi and its members include Kinkou, Tattoo, Typhoid Mary, Stone, and Roshi's own son Kirigi. The Hand's ninjas are clad in black while the opposing Chaste members are clothed in white.

Video games
 In X-Men vs. Street Fighter, Cammy is propositioned by the Hand, only to be rescued by Psylocke.
 The Hand appears in the PSP version of X-Men Origins: Wolverine. In the game, Team X (led by Maj. William Stryker, and consisting of James Howlett, Victor Creed, John Wraith, Agent Zero, Frederick Dukes, and Wade Wilson) need to obtain information about an adamantium orb which was later grafted on Howlett to be the Wolverine. After that, brothers Creed and Howlett discover the location of the Hand. Creed pursues the leader while Howlett fights the army of the Hand. Creed is defeated, so when Howlett pursues the leader, she activates a robot which Howlett destroys. The leader decides not to fight him as he is a formidable opponent, and Howlett decides the same only to be thrown in a lava pit by Creed.
 The Hand's hideout is one of the stages in Marvel vs. Capcom 3: Fate of Two Worlds.
 In Ultimate Marvel vs. Capcom 3, in addition to The Hand Hideout reappearing, Shadowland will feature including Hand Ninjas and Daredevil. In addition, one of Strider Hiryu's alternate costumes is directly influenced by The Hand.
 The Hand appears in Marvel: Avengers Alliance. Bullseye and Elektra are shown to be associated with the group. Its foot soldiers consist of Hand Assassins (which are masters of dual-wielding tantos), Hand Dragons (which are masters of melee and can counter any melee attacks), Hand Ninjas (which are masters of sneak attacks and use smoke bombs), Hand Scorpions (which use their naginatas to Pinion an opponent leaving their Evasion down), Hand Shadows (whom use their dual tantas to cause their victims to bleed), Hand Shinobis (which are masters of the naginatas), Hand Soldiers (which are masters of the katanas), Hand Spies (which rely on their dual tantas to cause their victims to bleed), and Hand Warriors (who rely on blinding their opponents and lowering their accuracy).
 The Hand appears in Marvel Heroes.

In popular culture
 The Foot Clan were initially created as a parody of the Hand for use in the original Teenage Mutant Ninja Turtles'' comic which itself was a parody of Frank Miller's work on Daredevil.

References

External links
 The Hand at Marvel.com
 
 The Hand at Marvel Wiki
 The Hand at Comic Vine

Comic book terrorist organizations
Comics characters introduced in 1981
Daredevil (Marvel Comics)
Fictional cults
Fictional gangs
Fictional ninja
Fictional organized crime groups
Fictional secret societies
Marvel Comics martial artists